Walter Freeman Gates (died February 5, 1828) was a merchant and political figure in Upper Canada. He represented Grenville County in the Legislative Assembly of Upper Canada from 1820 to 1824.

Gates was educated by the Reverent John Strachan. He lived in Johnstown. Gates served as a captain in a cavalry unit in the militia. He was named a justice of the peace for the Johnstown District in 1821. He died in Johnstown.

References 
Becoming Prominent: Leadership in Upper Canada, 1791-1841, J.K. Johnson (1989)

Year of birth missing
1828 deaths
Members of the Legislative Assembly of Upper Canada
Canadian justices of the peace